Steve Burney is a former professional rugby league footballer who played in the 1980s. He played at club level for Whitehaven (two spells), and lower grades for Western Suburbs Magpies, as a  during the era of contested scrums.

References

External links
Search for "Burney" at stats.rleague.com
Haven star on a cruel twist of fate that cut short Oz adventure
Former Haven skipper Jeff’s pride in chocolate, blue and gold

Living people
Place of birth missing (living people)
Rugby league second-rows
Whitehaven R.L.F.C. players
Year of birth missing (living people)